The Australian Conservatives was formed in July 2016 as a conservative political activist group in Australia and as a political party in February 2017. It was led by Cory Bernardi, who had been elected to the Senate for the Liberal Party, but resigned citing disagreements with the Liberal/National Coalition, its policies and leadership under Malcolm Turnbull.

The Family First Party and its two state parliamentarians, Dennis Hood and Robert Brokenshire, joined and merged with the Australian Conservatives in April 2017. Brokenshire was not re-elected at the 2018 state election; Hood left the Conservatives to join the Liberal Party on 26 March 2018, leaving Bernardi as the sole remaining member in federal parliament, whose present term in the senate ran until 30 June 2022. In September 2017, the leaders of the Victorian branch of the Australian Christians agreed to merge the Victorian branch with the Conservatives.

On 20 June 2019, Bernardi announced that he would deregister the party following the re-election of the Coalition Morrison Government at the 2019 Australian federal election, citing a lack of political success and poor financial position. The party was deregistered on 25 June 2019.

History

Activist group
The Australian Conservatives were established by Senator Bernardi as a conservative political activist group on 6 July 2016. The group was announced by Bernardi on his personal blog as a conservative "movement" to "help change politics and to give common sense a united voice". Bernardi cited the results of the 2016 federal election as a motivator for the group's establishment, stating that "over 1.7m votes were cast for right-of-centre or conservative parties rather than the Liberals", and that "the clear mission now is to bring people together for the good of the country." Despite contemporary media speculation when he created the group, following numerous public expressions of disappointment towards the Liberals, its policies, and leader Malcolm Turnbull, he stated that its establishment did not signal any breakaway from the Liberals, of which he was a senator, and that its intent was to "make the Liberals stronger". Within a month, the group's online newsletter reached over 50,000 subscribers.

Queensland Liberal National Party MP George Christensen was one of the first Coalition members of Parliament to support Bernardi and the Australian Conservatives, following his shared dissatisfaction with the election results. Despite this, Bernardi hinted otherwise in the months following, often going against Coalition policy and criticising the government, in particular over the Racial Discrimination Act debate, especially 18C. In late December 2016, Bernardi held controversial meetings with members of the United States presidential campaign of Donald Trump, allegedly in preparation for forming a breakaway party after continued dissatisfaction with the party and its policies, While he refrained from commenting on renewed speculation that he would split, he was met with negative reception from fellow party colleagues, including former Prime Minister and Liberal leader Tony Abbott.

Party foundation

On 7 February 2017, Bernardi announced his resignation from the Liberals through a speech in the Senate, opting to advance the Australian Conservatives as a political party, and sit on the Senate crossbench as its leader. In his speech, Bernardi claimed that "the level of public disenchantment with the major parties, the lack of confidence in our political process and the concern about the direction of our nation is very, very strong," and rationalised the creation of the Conservatives as a political party with the "need to find a better way". Bernardi also cited the resurgence and rise of conservative parties such as Pauline Hanson's One Nation as proof of such. Although dissatisfaction with the leadership of the Coalition was still shared by many in Parliament, numerous members have since denied any intention to join the Australian Conservatives, with most of them strongly criticising Bernardi—some described his move as a "betrayal". Tony Pasin, in particular, described Bernardi's move as unsurprising, "given the way that conservatives from South Australia are treated by the leadership of the Liberals".

On 7 April 2017, Kirralie Smith—a former candidate for the Australian Liberty Alliance and a member of the Q Society of Australia and Senate candidate for New South Wales in 2016—joined the party. The Australian Liberty Alliance discussed the prospect of merging with the Australian Conservatives, but ultimately declined the offer. Australian Conservatives was registered as a political party with the Australian Electoral Commission on 12 April 2017. Later that month, the party formed a Senate voting bloc with the Liberal Democratic Party Senator David Leyonhjelm. The party issued a policy release in April 2017 urging party members to petition major chocolate companies to oppose Easter Eggs being renamed Holiday Eggs. The release caused confusion on the grounds that there was no evidence any major chocolate company had ever done that in Australia, or that anyone had ever asked them to.

In May 2017, Bernardi met the national and Victorian state leadership of the Australian Christians to discuss a merger between the two parties. On 26 June 2017 it was revealed that Victorian MLC Rachel Carling-Jenkins was leaving the Democratic Labour Party to join the Australian Conservatives. The Democratic Labour Party declined an offer to merge with the Australian Conservatives. On 11 August 2017, former federal Liberal MP Dennis Jensen announced that he was defecting to the Australian Conservatives, and urged Liberal Party members in Western Australia to join him. In September  2017, the Victoria state leadership of the Australian Christians merged between the two parties.

In February 2018, Lyle Shelton resigned from his lobbying position at Australian Christian Lobby to enter party politics, joining the Australian Conservatives as federal communications director. It has been speculated that he will be one of the party's candidates at the next federal election. Later that month, former One Nation Senator Fraser Anning joined the party's voting bloc in the Senate, but remained an independent Senator.

Merger with Family First
On 25 April 2017, it was announced that the Family First Party would merge with the Australian Conservatives, with its two members of the South Australian Legislative Council joining the party. Newly-appointed Family First senator Lucy Gichuhi did not join the Conservatives.

Family First was generally considered to be part of the Christian right. Though it had no formal affiliation with any particular religious organisation, Family First was strongly linked to the Pentecostal church in South Australia, and nationally with smaller Christian denominations. Family First in South Australia was viewed as an infusion of ex-Liberals via Robert Brokenshire and Bob Day. The party advocated a moral and family values agenda, but Day, who would become Family First's major donor, later reoriented Family First to emphasise issues such as industrial relations reform, free speech and smaller government, which brought Family First closer to Bernardi's Conservatives.

Electoral performance
The party made modest showings at the 2017 Bennelong and 2018 Batman by-elections, achieving primary vote of 4.29% and 6.41%, respectively, the latter in the absence of Liberal Party candidate, failing to elect a candidate in either instance.

In March 2018, the party lost both of its representatives in the South Australian Legislative Council. Robert Brokenshire lost his bid for reelection, and parliamentary leader Dennis Hood defected to the Liberal Party, which nine days prior had won government in the state election. At the election, the Australian Conservatives suffered a 3.2% swing in the South Australian House of Assembly (from a Family First vote of 6.2% in 2014) for a primary vote of 3.0%. It stood 33 candidates for the lower house, none of whom came close to being elected. It suffered a swing of 0.9% swing in the Legislative Council (from a Family First vote of 4.4% in 2014) for a primary vote of 3.5%.

In the 2019 New South Wales state election, the Australian Conservatives won approximately 0.6% of the vote.

In the subsequent federal election, the Australian Conservatives ran candidates for the senate in every state but failed to win any seats. In light of this result, Bernardi announced he would start the process of deregistering the party. Bernardi said that in addition to the party's poor showing at the polls, he believed that the Coalition's upset victory under new Prime Minister Scott Morrison proved that "common sense" had returned to Canberra, which was "all we, as Australian Conservatives, have ever sought to do."

Parliamentary representatives

Former
Federal

 Cory Bernardi, Federal leader, Australian Senate (2017–2019; former member of the Liberal Party). His six-year term in the Senate expires on 31 June 2022.

State

 Robert Brokenshire, Legislative Council of South Australia (2017–2018; former member of the Family First Party), lost his seat at the 2018 state election.
 Dennis Hood, South Australian leader, Legislative Council of South Australia (2017–2018; former member of the Family First Party); defected to the Liberal Party on 22 March 2018
Rachel Carling-Jenkins, Legislative Council of Victoria (2017–2018; former member of the Democratic Labour Party), left the party in August 2018.

Policies
The Australian Conservatives' policies included:

Oppose

 Safe schools program as political indoctrination within schools
 Subsidies for renewable energy
Any renewable energy targets
Paris Climate Agreement
 Revenue-raising measures forced upon police that are not genuinely about improving community safety
 Property rights being curtailed or usurped
 Moves to change Australia Day
 Same-sex marriage and LGBT sex education
 Abortion

Support
Freedom of religion
A reduction in immigration levels and a strengthening of citizenship laws
The promotion of Australian values and Australia's Western civilisational heritage, the protection of the current flag and the retention of Australia Day on 26 January
Industrial relations reform
 Control of all government spending and getting the budget back into surplus
 A national child sex offenders register available to the public
 A pay freeze for politicians and senior public servants
 The merger of ABC and SBS into a single, consolidated broadcaster
 A public database of campaign and political spending
 The use of nuclear power
 A Royal Commission into Chinese Communist Party influence in Australia
 An ‘ethic of reciprocity’ in Australia's foreign investment and free trade agreements
 The uncluttering of school curricula and a focus on educational basics

See also

List of political parties in Australia
Conservatism in Australia

Notes

References

2017 establishments in Australia
2019 disestablishments in Australia
Defunct political parties in Australia
Anti-abortion organisations in Australia
Conservative parties in Australia
Anti-Islam sentiment in Australia
Political parties established in 2017
Political parties disestablished in 2019
Political parties in Victoria (Australia)
Political schisms